The Certosa di Pavia Altarpiece was an oil on panel altarpiece by Pietro Perugino. It dates to around 1496 to 1500 and three of its panels are now in the National Gallery, London. Art historians believe that the central panel is an autograph copy of the Madonna del Sacco.

History
It was commissioned by Ludovico Sforza for the chapel of Saint Michael in the Certosa di Pavia, a building symbolic of the Visconti-Sforza's patronage of the church and the arts. He had already sent an agent to Florence in 1490 to find out about the artistic scene and converse with Sandro Botticelli, Domenico Ghirlandaio, Filippino Lippi and Pietro Vannucci. Sforza initially commissioned a Deposition from Lippi, but this was not completed and so he instead decided in 1494 to commission Perugino.

The altarpiece originally had six panels. The central lower panel shows the Madonna and Child with angels, whilst the left panel shows the archangel Michael trampling Satan and the right panel shows Tobias and Raphael. The horizon on the side panels is no longer at the same level as that in the central panel, showing how all three panels seem to have been cut down. The knees of the Madonna and the bag on the left hand side of the central panel are lost, whilst little remains of the serpent at Michael's feet and the small dog at Raphael's feet.

The top panel, with the figure of the Eternal Father remained at the Certosa, while three panels were looted in 1784 and were acquired by the National Gallery in London in 1856. Some 1950s photographs show a non-original pediment above the side panels, which has now been removed. In place of the London panels are three copies painted in 1586.

References

Sources
Three panels from an altarpiece; Pietro Perugino; National Gallery, London

1490s paintings
Paintings by Pietro Perugino
Paintings of the Madonna and Child
Paintings depicting Michael (archangel)
Paintings of Raphael (archangel)
Paintings depicting Tobias
Altarpieces